Bunhead or Bunheads may refer to:
Bunheads, an American comedy-drama television series created by Amy Sherman-Palladino and Lamar Damon
BunHead Records, an imprint Kim Petras used to release music as an independent artist
Princess Bunhead, a character from Thumb Wars and a parody of Princess Leia from Star Wars